The Sir Rupert Clarke Stakes, registered as the Invitation Stakes,  is a Melbourne Racing Club Group 1 Thoroughbred open handicap horse race, run over a distance of 1400 metres at Caulfield Racecourse, Melbourne, Australia in late September. Total prize money for the race is A$1,000,000.

History
Prior to 1994, the race was held on Royal Melbourne Show Day, which was observed on the Thursday in the last full week of September as a public holiday.
The race was renamed in 2005 after former chairman of the Victorian Amateur Turf Club, Sir Rupert Clarke, who died in 2005.

Name
 1951–1974 - Invitation Stakes 
 1975–1988 - Marlboro Cup
 1989–1991 - Show Day Cup
 1992–1999 - Vic Health Cup
 2000–2001 - Eat Well Live Well Cup
 2002–2005 - Dubai Racing Club Cup
 2006–2013 - Sir Rupert Clarke Stakes
 2014 - Sir Rupert Clarke Charity Cup
 2015 onwards - Sir Rupert Clarke Stakes

Grade
1951–1978 - Principal Race
1979 onwards Group 1

Distance
 1951–1971 - 7 furlongs (~1400 metres)
 1974 onwards  - 1400 metres

Winners

2022 - Callsign Mav
2021 - Sierra Sue
2020 - Behemoth
2019 - Begood Toya Mother
2018 - Jungle Cat
2017 - Santa Ana Lane
2016 - Bon Aurum
2015 - Stratum Star
2014 - Trust In A Gust
2013 - Rebel Dane
2012 - Moment Of Change
2011 - Toorak Toff
2010 - Response
2009 - Turffontein
2008 - Orange County
2007 - Bon Hoffa
2006 - Rewaaya
2005 - Barely A Moment
2004 - Regal Roller
2003 - Exceed And Excel
2002 - Pernod
2001 - Mr. Murphy
2000 - Testa Rossa
1999 - Testa Rossa
1998 - Lord Luskin
1997 - Cut Up Rough
1996 - Encosta De Lago
1995 - Our Maizcay
1994 - Poetic King
1993 - Black Rouge
1992 - Mannerism
1991 - St. Jude
1990 - Submariner
1989 - Potrero
1988 - Rancho Ruler
1987 - Western Pago
1986 - Canny Lass
1985 - Trichelle
1984 - King Phoenix
1983 - Ranger's Son
1982 - Magari
1981 - Soldier Of Fortune
1980 - Torbek
1979 - Private Talk
1978 - Manikato
1977 - Raffindale
1976 - Private Talk
1975 - Cap D'Antibes
1974 - Ptery's Son
1973 - Millefleurs
1972 - Proud Toff
1971 - Tauto
1970 - Tauto
1969 - Heralding
1968 - Joking
1967 - Snub
1966 - Maritana
1965 - Nicopolis
1964 - Ripa
1963 - Samson
1962 - Anonyme
1961 - Anonyme
1960 - My Peak
1959 - St. Joel
1958 - Gay Saba
1957 - Luire
1956 - St. Joel
1955 - Matrice
1954 - Rio Janeiro
1953 - St. Joel
1952 - Fetlar
1951 - Jovial Lad

See also
 List of Australian Group races
Group races

References

Group 1 stakes races in Australia
Caulfield Racecourse